The following lists events that occurred in 2018 in Armenia.

Incumbents
President: Serzh Sargsyan (until 9 April), Armen Sarkissian (from 9 April)
Prime Minister: Karen Karapetyan (until 9 April, acting Prime Minister from 9 April to 17 April), Serzh Sargsyan (17 April to 23 April), Karen Karapetyan (acting Prime Minister from 23 April to 8 May), Nikol Pashinyan (from 8 May)
Speaker: Ara Babloyan

Events

February
February 9–25 – 3 athletes from Armenia competed at the 2018 Winter Olympics.

April

April 17 – Protests intensify after Serzh Sargsyan former President of Armenia is appointed Prime Minister of Armenia, in what opposition figures have described as a "power grab".
April 22 – Protest leader Nikol Pashinyan is arrested by police after a short meeting with Prime Minister Sargsyan, who left after three minutes alleging he was blackmailed to resign.
April 23 – Serzh Sargsyan officially resigns as Prime Minister after 11 days of protests and released Pashinyan who was detained yesterday, reportedly stating "The street movement is against my tenure. I am fulfilling your demand," and "You were right; I was wrong".

May
May 8 – Nikol Pashinyan is elected as Prime Minister of Armenia.
May 12 – The Pashinyan government is formed.
May 28 – Celebrations of the centennial of the founding of the First Armenian Republic.

June
June 16 – Former Deputy Defense Minister and parliamentarian Manvel Grigoryan was arrested in Vagharshapat by the National Security Service and was charged with the possession of firearms and ammunition illegally.

July
July 26 – The Special Investigative Service (SIS) arrests and charges former President of Armenia Robert Kocharyan with “overthrowing constitutional order of Armenia” in response to the 2008 Armenian presidential election protests in the final weeks of his tenure. That same day, Colonel General Yuri Khachaturov was indicted on the same charge of disrupting constitutional order during the protests when he was the then-Commander of the Yerevan Garrison.

October
October 3 – Pashinyan fires six members of his cabinet after their respective political parties, the Armenian Revolutionary Federation and the Tsarukyan Alliance supported a parliamentary bill which would effectively limit the role of the prime minister in calling snap elections to the National Assembly.
October 16 – Pashinyan resigns in protest of the actions taken by the two parties and promises to serve as the acting head of government until elections are held.

November
November 1 – Pashinyan announces that his country will try to begin the process normalizing relations with Turkey without preconditions, saying that recognition of the Armenian genocide is a "security issue", rather than a matter of Armenian-Turkish relations.
November 6 – The European Party of Armenia is founded in Yerevan by filmmaker Tigran Khzmalyan

December
December 9 – The My Step Alliance won the parliamentary elections with an overwhelming majority of the vote, resulting in the coalition winning 88 of the 132 seats in the assembly.

Births

Deaths
February 28 - Albert Mkrtchyan, People's Artist of Armenia (b. 1937)
October 1 - Charles Aznavour, French-Armenian singer, lyricist, actor and diplomat (b. 1924)

References

 
2010s in Armenia
Years of the 21st century in Armenia
Armenia
Armenia
Armenia